Stephen Foster Memorial Day is a United States Federal Observance Day observed on January 13. According to 36 U.S.C. § 140, Stephen Foster Memorial Day celebrates the life of American songwriter Stephen Foster. The date commemorates date that Foster died.  The law took effect on November 2, 1966, and the day was first observed in January 1967.

Notes

Observances in the United States
Stephen Foster
January observances